Kyani ( meaning "blue") is a settlement in the municipality of Didymoteicho in the northern Evros regional unit, Greece. It is situated between farmlands in the plains on the right bank of the river Erythropotamos, at 40 m elevation. In 2011 its population was 474. It is 3 km northeast of Asvestades, 4 km southwest of Mani, and 10 km northwest of Didymoteicho.

Population

History 
During the Ottoman period Kyani was known under the name Çavuşlu. At the beginning of the 20th century, a Greek school with 25 students was under operation in the village. Kyani became part of Greece after the end of World War I. Its current population is mostly descendants of Greek refugees from Eastern Thrace and Muslims.

See also
List of settlements in the Evros regional unit

Location

References

External links
Kyäni at the GTP Travel Pages

Didymoteicho
Populated places in Evros (regional unit)